Abraham Neumann (1873–1942) was a Polish painter and artist.

Biography
Neumann was born in Sierpc, Congress Poland, on February 6, 1873. In 1892, at the age of 19, he went to Warsaw to study painting and later, after being influenced by Hirszenberg, he decided to study in Kraków's Academy of Fine Arts.

In 1903, he studied in Paris at the Académie Julian. At that time, he also visited England, the Netherlands, Belgium, and Germany. In addition, he also spent time in Israel prior to its founding (British mandate in Palestine), and in the United States where he traveled after the First World War. He taught at the Bezalel Academy of Art and Design in Jerusalem during the years 1925–1927. In 1909, he took part in an exhibition of paintings executed en plein air in Rybiniszki in the Polish Livonia [eastern Latvia]. He lived in Zakopane, Poland, Vienna, and Krakow.

His works consist of paintings of landscapes from the Tatra Mountains, Kazimierz Dolny, Brittany, Palestine, as well as portraits and still lives. He was the first Jewish painter from Poland to go to Palestine in 1904, and also the first to encounter the challenges posed to painting there, including the different kind of light. He struggled to solve these problems for a long time, and by his second journey to the country, local themes had become permanent characteristics in his work.

He belonged to the Krakow branch of the Polish Artists' Union and to the Association of Jewish Painters and Sculptors in Krakow. He participated in the "Sztuka" exhibitions, held individual exhibitions in Kraków and Lvov in Warsaw, Łódź, and Berlin. He also took part in the "Secession" exhibitions in Vienna and in 1916 he took part in the Jewish Art exhibitions in Warsaw.

Neumann was executed in the Kraków Ghetto on June 4, 1942.

External links
 Neumann's works in Central Jewish Library

Selected works
 Abraham Neumann (1873-1942) at Gallery97, Tel Aviv

1873 births
1942 deaths
People from Sierpc
Polish painters of Jewish descent
People who died in the Kraków Ghetto
Polish civilians killed in World War II
Académie Julian alumni
20th-century Polish painters
20th-century Polish male artists
19th-century Polish painters
19th-century Polish male artists
Modern painters
Polish male painters
Polish expatriates in the United States
Expatriates from Poland in Mandatory Palestine